The 1990 Oregon Ducks football team represented the University of Oregon in the 1990 NCAA Division I-A football season. The Ducks outscored their opponents 341 to 221 points. Led by fourteenth-year head coach Rich Brooks, the Ducks were 8–3 in the regular season (4–3 in Pac-10, third) and competed in the Freedom Bowl.

For the only time since 1935, Northwest foe Washington State was not on the Ducks' schedule (excluding the war years without teams (1943, 1944)).

Schedule

Roster

Game summaries

UCLA

California

Oregon State

Freedom Bowl

Draft picks
The following players were selected in the 1991 NFL Draft.

References

Oregon
Oregon Ducks football seasons
Oregon Ducks football